Senseless is a 1998 American buddy comedy science fiction film directed by Penelope Spheeris and written by Greg Erb and Craig Mazin. The film stars Marlon Wayans, David Spade, and Matthew Lillard as college students.

Plot
Darryl Witherspoon (Marlon Wayans) is an economics student at Stratford University, who does not have the advantages of his wealthy nemesis, Scott Thorpe (David Spade), or his best friend Tim LaFlour (Matthew Lillard), straight edge punk rocker who has a hockey scholarship. Darryl is so broke he donates four pints of blood in one day (playing a different character each time) and four vials of sperm in one day. Darryl's big break comes when he enters a competition, where the winner gets a high-paying Wall Street job. But when Scott enters the competition, it seems Darryl's break has gone down the drain.  He takes on a high-paying experiment to test a drug that enhances the five senses. Darryl uses it to his advantage and he impresses the competition's supervisor, Mr. Tyson (Rip Torn) and he even joins the hockey team as a goalie. But after taking an extra dose one night, he experiences side effects. The experiment's supervisor, Dr. Thomas Wheedon (Brad Dourif), tells Darryl only four of his senses will work at a time until the drug leaves his body.

As Darryl struggles, Tim thinks that his friend is on heroin and gets worried about him. Darryl's luck then starts going down the drain as he loses the hockey game because his sense of sight is lost. He also mistakenly confesses love to his girlfriend's father who he thinks is his girlfriend as his sense of sight is lost. Her father turns out to be Mr. Tyson. He also acts very clumsily (because of the loss of the ability to see) during the basketball game he is invited to see with a client who needs to be impressed in order for Darryl to score some points with the Smythe-Bates guys. Luckily, the client thinks Darryl is just funny and signs a contract with the company.

As the story progresses, Darryl asks his friend Tim to help him study for the next day's interview.  At that exact moment, Scott studies for the test with the aid of his rich father's employees. Scott is shown to answer a question correctly but he does not know the reason behind it, he ignores the question. The next day, the drug leaves Darryl's system and now all his five senses operate normally. During the interview, it comes down to Darryl and Scott, Scott is asked the same question he was asked last night, he answers it correctly, but when asked the reason, he does not know, Darryl steps in, gives the  correct reason and scores the position of junior analyst at Smythe-Bates. But in his speech, he confesses that he cheated by taking an experimental drug. A meeting is called to decide his fate and Mr. Tyson tells him that he himself started out in the mail room and Darryl should too, if he serves one year duty in the mail room, he will score the position of junior analyst. The story skips a year and Darryl is shown to ask his mom to move into a deluxe apartment. The movie ends with Darryl entering the Smythe-Bates building on his first day, with a familiar-looking doorman (Sherman Hemsley).

Cast
 Marlon Wayans as Darryl Witherspoon
 David Spade as Scott Thorpe
 Matthew Lillard as Tim LaFlour
 Brad Dourif as Dr. Thomas Wheedon
 Tamara Taylor as Janice Tyson
 Rip Torn as Randall Tyson
 Esther Scott as Denise Witherspoon
 Richard McGonagle as Robert Bellwether
 Kenya Moore as Lorraine
 Vicellous Shannon as Carter
 Ernie Lively as Coach Brandau
 Patrick Ewing as Himself
 Greg Grunberg as Steve the commentator
 Debra Jo Rupp as Fertility clinic attendant
 Mark Christopher Lawrence as Wig shop owner
 Sherman Hemsley as Smythe-Bates Doorman

Production
Senseless was financed by Dimension Films/Miramax, and was the second movie idea Princeton University comedy writers Craig Mazin and Greg Erb had successfully pitched, with their first being the 1997 Buena Vista comedy RocketMan. Filming began during June 1997 in Los Angeles.

Reception

Box office
Senseless opened on February 20, 1998 and, in its opening weekend, made $5,337,651 at #5 behind Titanics tenth weekend, The Wedding Singers second, Spheres second, and Good Will Huntings twelfth.

Critical response
The film received negative reviews. Rotten Tomatoes gave the film an approval rating of 6% based on reviews from 17 critics. On Metacritic the film has a score of 36% based on reviews from 13 critics, indicating "generally unfavorable reviews".
Audiences polled by CinemaScore gave the film an average grade of "B+" on an A+ to F scale.

Roger Ebert gave the film 2.5 out of 4.

Soundtrack
The Senseless soundtrack was released February 10, 1998 by Gee Street Records.

 "Busy Child" - The Crystal Method
 "Song for Lindy" - Fatboy Slim
 "Absurd" - Fluke
 "Together" - Moby
 "Do You Want to Freak?" - The Freak Brothers
 "The Unexplained" - Gravediggaz
 "Graciosa" - Moby
 "Reeferendrum" - Fluke
 "Set Back" - Fluke
 "Jungle Brother (True Blue)" - Jungle Brothers
 "Spacefunk" - Headrillaz
 "Perfect for You" - P.M. Dawn
 "Atom Bomb" - Fluke
 "Look Around My Window" - Ambersunshower
 "Mucho Dinero" - Yankee B.
 "Smash the State" - Naked Aggression
 "Gotta Be...Movin' on Up" - Prince Be of P.M. Dawn featuring Ky-Mani and John Forté

References

External links
 
 

1998 films
1990s buddy comedy films
1998 romantic comedy films
African-American comedy films
American buddy comedy films
American independent films
American romantic comedy films
Dimension Films films
Films directed by Penelope Spheeris
Films produced by Don Carmody
Films set in universities and colleges
Mandeville Films films
Films produced by David Hoberman
1990s English-language films
1990s American films
Films with screenplays by Craig Mazin